John C. Brownell (February 5, 1877 – August 27, 1961) was an actor and writer who had a career in theater and film in the U.S. Yale University has a collection of his papers. Brownell was born in Burlington, Vermont. He wrote several plays. He worked in the film industry for Universal Film Corporation. He died in Starksboro, Vermont.

Theater
Her Majesty the Widow
Mississippi rainbow : a modern comedy of Negro life (1938)
The Nut Farm
A Woman of the Soil

Selected filmography
(as screenwriter)
Susan's Gentleman (1917)
 The Boy Girl (1917)
 The Girl by the Roadside (1917)
 The Raggedy Queen (1917)
 Little Miss Nobody (1917)
Bad Company (1925)
Three of a Kind (1925)
The King of the Turf (1926)
Bitter Sweets (1928)
Out with the Tide (1928)
The Nut Farm (1935)

References

External links

1877 births
1961 deaths
20th-century American male actors
American dramatists and playwrights
20th-century American screenwriters